Count Prosper Anton Josef von Sinzendorf (May 30, 1700 – February 9, 1756) was an Austrian nobleman and courtier, Counsellor and Chamberlain at the Imperial Court in Vienna.

He came from the Sinzendorf noble family and  married Countess Marie Philippine von Althann. 
He possessed , among others,the manorial Estate Trpist-Triebel in Bohemia, where he built the Château Trpísty  (Schloss Trpist in German, Zámek Trpísty in Czech) in 1729. His descendants continued to live there until the end of the 18th century.

18th-century Austrian people
Counts of Austria
1700 births
1756 deaths